Kimberly Hawthorne is an American actress. She began her career appearing on Broadway and daytime soap operas, before landing supporting roles on the prime time dramas. From 2000 to 2005, Hawthorne was regular cast member in the CBC Television police drama, Da Vinci's Inquest. From 2016 to 2020, she starred as Kerissa Greenleaf in the Oprah Winfrey Network drama series, Greenleaf.

Early life
Hawthorne was born in Jersey City, New Jersey. She received her Bachelor of Arts in musical theatre from Birmingham–Southern College in Alabama. After graduating, she began working on stage, making her professional theatre debut at the Alliance Theatre in Atlanta, Georgia. In mid-1990s, She moved to New York City, where she began appearing.

Career
Hawthorne made her first screen appearance in an episode of NBC drama series, I'll Fly Away. While living in Atlanta, she also appeared in three episodes of In the Heat of the Night. From 1995 to 1996, she played Belinda Keefer in the ABC daytime soap opera, All My Children. Amelia Marshall later replaced her in this role. In 1997, Hawthorne replaced Michelle Hurd in the role of Dana Kramer on the NBC soap opera, Another World. From 1997 to 1998, she starred in Cy Coleman's Broadway musical The Life. She later guest starred on Cosby, The Outer Limits, Stargate SG-1, The Twilight Zone, Andromeda, and The L Word.

From 2000 to 2005, Hawthorne had regular supporting role on the Canadian police drama series Da Vinci's Inquest as Det. Rose Williams. In same time, she had the recurring roles on Dark Angel and Jeremiah. In 2006, she was regular cast member in the short-lived HBO comedy series, Lucky Louie starring Louis C.K. The following year, she co-starred in the Canadian drama, Whistler. In 2014, she had the recurring role on the short-lived Fox legal drama, Rake. Hawthorne also has appeared on CSI: Miami, It's Always Sunny in Philadelphia, Private Practice, Rizzoli & Isles, Southland, Castle, Criminal Minds, and NCIS: Los Angeles.

In 2015, Hawthorne was cast as one of leads in the Oprah Winfrey Network drama series, Greenleaf.  She plays the role of Kerissa Greenleaf, Lamman Rucker's character's ambitious and controlling wife. The series ended in 2020 after five seasons. Hawthorne later appeared in How to Get Away with Murder, Criminal Minds and The Good Doctor.

Filmography

Film/Movie

Television

Awards and nominations

References

External links

American musical theatre actresses
Birmingham–Southern College alumni
Actresses from Jersey City, New Jersey
Living people
20th-century American actresses
21st-century American actresses
American television actresses
American film actresses
African-American actresses
American soap opera actresses
20th-century African-American women singers
21st-century African-American women
21st-century African-American people
Year of birth missing (living people)